Solenofilomorphidae is a family of acoels.

Genera
There are 5 genera in the family Solenofilomorphidae.

Endocincta Crezee, 1975
Fusantrum Crezee, 1975
Myopea Crezee, 1975
Oligofilomorpha Dörjes, 1971
Solenofilomorpha Dörjes, 1968

Species
There are 11 species in the family Solenofilomorphidae.

Notes

References

Acoelomorphs